Trillium pusillum is a species of flowering plant in the family Melanthiaceae known by the common names dwarf trillium, least trillium and dwarf wakerobin. It is native to the southeastern and south-central United States from Oklahoma to Maryland.

Description

Trillium pusillum is a perennial herbaceous plant with a thin, branching, horizontal rhizome. They increase in size after flowering. The three bracts are dark green, sometimes with a red tinge when new. The six stamens are tipped with lavender or yellow anthers each up to a centimeter long. The stigmas have long, narrow, spreading lobes.

Ecology

Trillium pusillum flowers from March to early May. It can be found in several habitat types, including savannas, swamps, bogs, forests and woods, and fields. It grows on acidic soils. In Missouri, it is commonly pollinated by the western honey bee (Apis mellifera), and the seeds are dispersed by ants and harvestmen.

Taxonomy

In addition to Trillium pusillum Michx., the following names are widely accepted:

 Trillium pusillum var. pusillum
 Trillium pusillum var. virginianum Fernald

The flowers of var. virginianum are usually slightly smaller than those of var. pusillum. Also, the flower of var. pusillum sits on a pedicel  in length whereas the flower of var. virginianum is sessile or subsessile.

Many other names are in use, including:

 Trillium pusillum var. ozarkanum (E.J.Palmer & Steyerm.) Steyerm.
 Trillium pusillum var. texanum (Buckley) Reveal & C.R.Broome

The name Trillium texanum Buckley, used interchangeably with Trillium pusillum var. texanum, is regarded by some as a synonym for Trillium pusillum var. pusillum.

Bibliography

References

External links

 
 Biodiversity Information Serving Our Nation (BISON) occurrence data and maps for Trillium pusillum ozarkanum
 Biodiversity Information Serving Our Nation (BISON) occurrence data and maps for Trillium pusillum pusillum
 Biodiversity Information Serving Our Nation (BISON) occurrence data and maps for Trillium pusillum virginianum

 
 

pusillum
Flora of the Southeastern United States
Flora of the United States
Flora of the Appalachian Mountains
Plants described in 1803
Taxa named by André Michaux